Frances James (3 February 1903  22 August 1988) was a Canadian soprano who specialized in concert repertoire. She worked prolifically as a performer on CBC Radio and as a recitalist from the late 1920s through the 1950s; premiering works by numerous Canadian composers of note and championing works by contemporary international composers. Her performances were noted for their musical intelligence and sophistication. Her singing was admired by several important composers, including Benjamin Britten, Paul Hindemith, and Darius Milhaud. While her performances, both live and on radio/disc, were mainly from the concert repertoire, she did perform in some broadcasts of operas on the radio and in the 1931 world premiere of Healey Willan's ballad opera Prince Charlie and Flora. In 1984 she was awarded the Canadian Music Council Medal.

Born in Saint John, New Brunswick, James studied singing with Walter Clapperton and Alfred Whitehead at the Schulich School of Music at McGill University. She also studied lieder with Emmy Heim at the Toronto Conservatory of Music in 1934, and later singing with Enrico Rosati and Maria Kurenko in New York and Roland Hayes in Boston. From 1952 to 1973 she taught voice at the University of Saskatchewan. She later taught at both the Victoria Conservatory of Music and the University of Victoria. Her notable pupils included mezzo-soprano Dorothy Howard, soprano Jane Leslie MacKenzie, and tenor Richard Margison. She was married to composer Murray Adaskin. She died, aged 85, in Victoria, British Columbia.

References
Citations

1903 births
1988 deaths
McGill University School of Music alumni
The Royal Conservatory of Music alumni
Academic staff of the University of Saskatchewan
Academic staff of the University of Victoria
Canadian operatic sopranos
Musicians from Saint John, New Brunswick
20th-century Canadian women opera singers